Lomovo is a rural locality (a selo) and the administrative center of Lomovskoye Rural Settlement, Ramonsky District, Voronezh Oblast, Russia. The population was 383 as of 2010. There are 8 streets.

Geography 
Lomovo is located 75 km northwest of Ramon (the district's administrative centre) by road. Bolshaya Vereyka is the nearest rural locality.

References 

Rural localities in Ramonsky District